Rubén Omar Romano Cachía (born May 18, 1958 in Buenos Aires) is an Argentine-Mexican former football player and the current manager of Mexican club Mazatlán.

Footballer career
Romano played in Argentina for Club Atlético Huracán before leaving for Mexico in 1980 to play for Club América. He played in seven other Mexican clubs: León, Necaxa, Puebla, Querétaro, Cruz Azul, Atlante, and Veracruz. He was a left footed player with a great talent for free kicks as well as an extraordinary playmaker. His best times were in León and Atlante.

He retired as a player at Atlante after the 1994–1995 season and scored 2 goals in his last game (Atlante 6-6 Puebla). In total, Romano scored 102 goals in the Mexican Football League. He is listed among the 100 best scorers of all time in Mexico.

Head coach
The same year he became the assistant coach for Ricardo La Volpe of Club Atlas.

He also worked as a coach for Celaya, Tecos, Morelia, Pachuca, and Cruz Azul. With Pachuca, he qualified for the Copa Libertadores.

Cruz Azul qualified for the Mexican playoffs in Romano's first season with the team, but lost to rivals América. Romano has qualified for the playoffs on six occasions for different teams.

Romano was kidnapped on July 19, 2005 near Xochimilco, in Mexico City by Omar Sandoval Orihuela. He was rescued on the night of September 21 of 2005, 65 days after the kidnapping, by agents of the Federal Investigation Agency. Replacing him in the interim was Isaac Mizrahi Smeke, who coached the first few weeks of Cruz Azul’s season. Romano returned to work a few days after his release, while Orihuela received twenty-six years imprisonment for the kidnapping. He was relieved of his duties with the club on December 9, 2005 after coaching for eleven matches during which time Cruz Azul won two, drew three and lost five. Mizrahi was then named permanent head coach of the club.

Afterwards, Romano was hired by Atlas. He ended the regular season in last place as he didn’t win the last 11 matches.

He was named head coach of Club América on February 18, 2008 due to president Guillermo Cañedo White's dismissal of Daniel Alberto Brailovsky after a run of disappointing results. On April 30, 2008, Romano finally announced his resignation from the team right after a 4-2 loss to Flamengo in the Copa Libertadores. Club América won the next three matches, including a 0-3 against Flamengo in the Maracanã Stadium. He was presented as the head coach of Santos Laguna on December 5, 2009. With the Santos Laguna, on his first tournament he got the team to the final, and on the second tournament he had the Santos on the first place on the table and of goals. He ceased to coach Santos Laguna on February 20, 2011, after losing several home games and making obscene gestures at the fans.

On August 14, 2013 Rubén Omar Romano replaced Manuel Lapuente at Puebla. He was reported on September 19, 2016 to have accepted the managerial position for a struggling CF America nearing their centenary anniversary. Club America officials later retracted the offer due to fan backlash.

See also
List of kidnappings

Managerial statistics

References

1958 births
Argentine football managers
Association football midfielders
Atlas F.C. managers
Living people
Footballers from Buenos Aires
Argentine emigrants to Mexico
Naturalized citizens of Mexico
Argentine footballers
Club Atlético Huracán footballers
San Lorenzo de Almagro footballers
Cruz Azul footballers
Club América footballers
Atlante F.C. footballers
Club León footballers
Club Necaxa footballers
Querétaro F.C. footballers
C.D. Veracruz footballers
Argentine Primera División players
Liga MX players
Mexican football managers
Missing person cases in Mexico
Atlético Morelia managers
Cruz Azul managers
C.F. Pachuca managers
Expatriate footballers in Mexico
Expatriate football managers in Mexico
Club América managers
Santos Laguna managers
Tecos F.C. managers
Club Tijuana managers
Los Angeles Aztecs players
North American Soccer League (1968–1984) players
Liga MX managers